Marie Under  ( – 25 September 1980) was one of the greatest Estonian poets. She was nominated for the Nobel Prize in Literature in 12 separate years.

Early life
Under was born in Reval (now Tallinn), Estonia to school teachers Priidu (1843–1930) and Leena Under (née Kerner) (1854–1934). She had two older siblings, Evangeline (1880–1932?) and Gottried (1881–1882) and two younger, Berta (1885–1974), and Christfried (1887–1934). She attended a private German girls' school. After graduating, she worked as a salesclerk in a bookstore.  In her free time, she wrote poetry in German. In 1902, she married an Estonian accountant, Carl Hacker. The couple had two children, Dagmar and Hedda, while living in Kuchino, a suburb of Moscow. However, in 1904, she fell in love with the Estonian artist Ants Laikmaa. Laikmaa convinced her to translate her poetry into Estonian and submitted her translated works to local newspapers.

Return to Estonia
In 1906, Under returned to Reval.  In 1913, she met Artur Adson, who became her secretary.  He also compiled the first volumes of her published poetry.  In 1924, Under divorced Carl Hacker and married Adson.

In the late 1910s, Under was involved in the influential Siuru literary movement. Named after a fire-bird in Finnic mythology, it was founded in 1917 and was an expressionistic and neo-romantic movement that ran counter to the Young Estonia formalist tradition. Other Estonian poets and authors involved in the Siuru movement at the time were Peet Aren, Otto Krusten, Friedebert Tuglas, Artur Adson, August Gailit, Johannes Semper and Henrik Visnapuu. Between 1917 and 1919, the group of poets published three volumes of poetry. In 1919 conflicts within the group led Visnapuu and Gailit to leave, while Johannes Barbarus and August Alle joined as new members.

Under was one of the founders of Estonian Writers' Union in 1922.

In the 1920s, Under was a frequent visitor at the house of Igor Severyanin, a Russian poet, in the village of Toila, where she often was on holiday. Severyanin published a book of translations from Under. Severyanin did not speak Estonian and used word-by-word translations as a basis.

Life in exile
Beginning in September 1944, the U.S.S.R. reoccupied Estonia.  Under and her family fled to Sweden.  They spent almost a year in a refugee camp.  In 1945, the family moved to Mälarhöjden, a suburb of Stockholm, Sweden, where Under lived until her death on 25 September 1980. She died in Stockholm and was buried in the Skogskyrkogården in Stockholm. In January 2015 it was announced that she was to be reburied in Estonia. On 9 June 2016, Under and Adson were interred at Rahumäe Cemetery in Tallinn alongside her daughter Hedda Hacker and sister Berta.

Translations
Under's work was translated into at least 26 languages. She is one of the best translated Estonian authors.
Russian by Igor Severyanin.
Komi by Nina Obrezkova (2008).
Udmurt by Nadezhda Pchelovodova (Nadi Mush, 2006).

Gallery

References

External links 

Estonian Literary Magazine article , einst.ee
Marie Under in pictures, kirmus.ee

1883 births
1980 deaths
Writers from Tallinn
People from the Governorate of Estonia
20th-century Estonian poets
Estonian women poets
20th-century Estonian women writers
Estonian World War II refugees
Estonian emigrants to Sweden
Burials at Skogskyrkogården
Burials at Rahumäe Cemetery